The Greenbelt–Prince George's Plaza Line, designated Route R3, was a bus route that was operated by the Washington Metropolitan Area Transit Authority between Greenbelt station and Prince George's Plaza station of the Green Line of the Washington Metro. The route provided service between the Greenbelt and Hyattsville during the weekday peak-hours. However the route was discontinued due to low ridership on March 27, 2016.

History
The "Greenbelt - Fort Totten" Line replaced the former "Sargent Road" Line on December 11, 1993. The "Sargent Road" Line originally operated as a Capital Transit Company Bus Route in the 1940s, as, "Route F6", between the intersections of 12th Street NE & Quincy Street NE in Brookland, D.C. and intersection of Ager Road & Somerset Street in Green Meadows, MD, during weekday rush hour/peak period times, and would only operate between the intersection of 12th Street NE & Quincy Street NE in Brookland, D.C. and the intersection of Gallatin Street NE & South Dakota Avenue NE in North Michigan Park, D.C. throughout non-rush hour/peak period times on weekdays. However; the Capital Transit Company F6 "Sargent Road" Line route would not operate at all on weekends.

1950's Route Changes

Eventually, around the mid-1950's, the F6 "Sargent Road" Line was converted into a DC Transit Bus Route when all Capital Transit Company Streetcar and Bus Routes were converted into DC Transit Bus Routes. F6 would keep operating on its same route until it was eventually discontinued around the mid-1960's.

1960's Route Changes

The F6 DC Transit Route was discontinued and replaced by the new F5 & F7 DC Transit Routes during the mid-1960's. Unlike Route F6, Routes F5 & F7 would operate between the Prince George's Plaza Shopping Center and Waterside Mall (F5)/ Federal Triangle (F7) in Downtown Washington D.C., during weekday morning/evening rush hour/peak period commuter times only. F5 & F7 would operate between the Prince George's Plaza Shopping Center and the intersection of Riggs Road & East - West Highway in Green Meadows, MD, via Toledo Terrace and East - West Highway, and then operate on the exact same routing as F6 between the intersections of Riggs Road & East - West Highway in Green Meadows, MD and  13th Street NE & Quincy Street NE in Brookland, D.C., and then simply remain on 13th Street NE past the intersection of Quincy Street NE, all the way up to the intersection of Rhode Island Avenue NE, then divert off 13th Street NE onto the intersection of Rhode Island Avenue NE, and operate on Rhode Island Avenue NE up to the intersection of 4th Street NE, and then operate via 4th Street NE, T Street NE, 3rd Street NE (towards the Prince George's Plaza Shopping Center), 2nd Street NE (towards Waterside Mall (F5)/ Federal Triangle (F7)), R Street NE, Eckington Place NE, Florida Avenue NE, First Street NE (towards Waterside Mall (F5)/ Federal Triangle (F7)), O Street NE (towards the Prince George's Plaza Shopping Center), New York Avenue NW, and 11th/12th Streets NW.

February 4, 1973 Route Changes

Both DC Transit "Sargent Road" Line Routes F5 & F7 eventually became WMATA Metrobus Routes on February 4, 1973, when WMATA bought out DC Transit, which was struggling financially, as well as three other failing bus companies that operated throughout the Washington D.C. Metropolitan Area and merged them all together to form its own, "Metrobus System". Even after becoming WMATA Metrobus Routes, F5 & F7 managed to keep their routings the exact same until March 27, 1976, when the Rhode Island Avenue station opened.

March 27, 1976 Route Changes

On March 27, 1976, when the Rhode Island Avenue station opened, the F5 & F7 Metrobus Routes were minorly rerouted to divert off Rhode Island Avenue NE to serve the Rhode Island Avenue station.

February 19, 1978 Route Changes

On February 19, 1978, when the Fort Totten station opened, the F7 Metrobus Route was discontinued and the F5 Metrobus Route was rerouted to operate between the Fort Totten station & Prince George's Plaza Shopping Center, via Galloway Street NE, South Dakota Avenue NE, Gallatin Street NE, Sargent Road NE, Sargent Road, Riggs Road, East - West Highway, and Toledo Terrace.

December 11, 1993 Route Changes

On December 11, 1993, when both the Prince George's Plaza and Greenbelt stations opened, the  R3 "Greenbelt - Fort Totten" Line was created as a brand new WMATA Metrobus Route on December 11, 1993, to replace the F5 "Sargent Road" Line, which was discontinued and to also provide alternative Metrobus service between the Prince George's Plaza Shopping Center and Greenbelt, in order to compensate for the loss of F6 Metrobus service between those two points when F6 was rerouted to operate between the Prince George's Plaza and New Carrollton stations, via the newly opened College Park - U of MD station, and no longer operate in/serve Greenbelt. R3 would operate on almost the same exact routing as the former F5 Metrobus Route between the Fort Totten station and Prince George's Plaza Shopping Center, only with the exception that it would divert off East - West Highway onto the intersection of 23rd Avenue, then loop around via Lewisdale Drive, Fordham Street, and 23rd Avenue, before returning to the intersection of East - West Highway and continuing the rest of its routing between the Fort Totten station & Prince George's Plaza Shopping Center. However; unlike the F6 Metrobus Route, R3 would only operate between the Prince George's Plaza Shopping Center and newly opened Greenbelt station, instead of operating all the way up to Greenbelt Center (Crescent Road & Gardenway), like F6 did prior to the opening of the Greenbelt station. On the other hand, R3 would continue to enter inside/directly serve Beltway Plaza just like the F6 Metrobus Route did. However; unlike the F6 Metrobus Route which would operate between the Prince George's Plaza Shopping Center and Beltway Plaza, via Belcrest Road, Adelphi Road, Campus Drive/the University of Maryland College Park Campus, Baltimore Avenue, and Greenbelt Road, R3 would instead operate between the Prince George's Plaza Shopping Center and Beltway Plaza, via Belcrest Road, the newly opened Prince George's Plaza station, Belcrest Road, East - West Highway, Adelphi Road, the newly constructed Archives II Building, Adelphi Road, Metzerott Road, University Boulevard East, and Greenbelt Road. Then after serving Beltway Plaza, R3 would then exit Beltway Plaza by making a right turn onto the intersection of Greenbelt Road in the westbound direction and operate to the newly opened Greenbelt Metro Station, via Cherrywood Lane and Greenbelt Metro Drive. Even though R3 would not directly enter/serve the University of Maryland College Park Campus directly, as it would simply remain on Adelphi Road north of the intersection of Campus Drive instead of diverting off Adelphi Road onto Campus Drive like F6 would always do, R3 would still serve the University of Maryland College Park Campus with its adjacently located bus stops at the intersection of Adelphi Road & Tulane Drive in Hyattsville, MD. However; R3 provided new Metrobus service on Adelphi Road, north of the intersection of Campus Drive, all the way up to the intersection of Metzerott Road in Adelphi/College Park, MD, on Metzerott Road between the intersections of Adelphi Road and University Boulevard East in College Park, MD, and on University Boulevard East between the intersections of Metzerott Road and Rhode Island Avenue in College Park, MD, which was not previously available. The R3 Metrobus Route would operate as an all-day Metrobus Route between the Fort Totten and Greenbelt stations, on weekdays and shortened trips between just the Fort Totten and Prince George's Plaza stations on weekends, providing a significantly higher amount of Metrobus Service than the limited weekday rush hour/peak period time only service that the F5 Metrobus Route used to provide between the Fort Totten station and Prince George's Plaza Shopping Center.

2001 Route Changes
On January 13, 2001, R3 was rerouted to operate on Toledo Terrace past the intersection of Toledo Place, all the way up to the intersection of Belcrest Road and enter the Prince George's Plaza Shopping Center from Belcrest Road, instead of cutting through the Prince George's Plaza Shopping Center from the intersection of Toledo Terrace itself.

2003 Route Changes
As of May 15, 2003, R3 was permanently rerouted to no longer directly enter/loop inside the Prince George's Plaza Shopping Center, due to the Metrobus terminal inside the mall, along with the former G.C. Murphy site the bus used to operate in front of, were demolished to make room for a new Target Store to be constructed on their spots.

2007 Route Changes
Around May/June, 2007 when the Mosaic Apartments were being constructed and a new roadblock was created on the eastern end of Prince George's Plaza station, the R3 had rerouted along with other routes that served Prince George's Plaza station that formerly made a left onto Belcrest Road. The R3, was required to exit Prince George's Plaza by making a turn onto East-West Highway, then turn Belcrest Road when traveling in the direction of Fort Totten station, or remain straight past Belcrest Road until reaching the intersection of Adelphi Road when traveling in the direction of the Greenbelt station. This change was made as the new road block and sign by the site of where the Mosaic Apartments were constructed on the eastern end of Prince George's Plaza, which no longer permitted left turns from Prince George's Plaza onto Belcrest Road.

June 17, 2012 Route Changes

On June 17, 2012, route R3 was shortened to operate between Greenbelt station and Prince George's Plaza station during the weekday peak hours only with service between Prince Georges Plaza and Fort Totten station being replaced by a rerouted F6 from New Carrollton station which would follow route R3's former routing. Route R2 would operate inside the Lewisdale neighborhood to replace parts of the R3 segment while route C8 diverted into the National Archives at College Park to replace route R3. The R3 would also discontinue the Beltway Plaza loop having it been replaced by the G12, G13, G14, G16 and the R12.

The main difference between F6's service between the Prince George's Plaza and Fort Totten stations compared to R3's service between those two stations was that F6 would only operated on weekdays only, while R3 provided service between those two stations daily.

The R3 would be renamed from the Greenbelt-Fort Totten Line to the Greenbelt-Prince George's Plaza Line while the F6 would be renamed into the New Carrollton-Fort Totten Line as of a result of the changes.

Discontinuation Of Service
On March 27, 2016, WMATA announced the discontinuation of R3 service due to low ridership on March 27, 2016. The diversion into the National Archives at College Park was replaced by route C8 while other routes provide alternative service on route R3 former routing. The reason WMATA decided to discontinue R3's service was because of the route's very low ridership levels/poor productivity, ever since June 17, 2012, when it stopped operating to the Fort Totten station and stopped operating in Lewisdale, which had some of the highest ridership rates/productivity levels and will not be in service anymore.

References 

R3
Transportation in Prince George's County, Maryland
1993 establishments in Maryland
2012 disestablishments in Maryland
2016 disestablishments in Maryland